Fleabane is a common name for some flowering plants in the family Asteraceae.

Most are in the subfamily Asteroideae:
 Conyza (butterweeds or horseweeds: Astereae)
 Erigeron (Astereae)
 Inula ("yellowheads": Inuleae)
 Pluchea (camphorweeds: Inuleae)
 Pulicaria (Inuleae)
 Vernonia (ironweeds: Vernonieae)

Asteraceae